Cheqa Jangeh-ye Olya (also Romanized as Cheqā Jangeh-ye ‘Olyā and Cheqā Jengāh-e ‘Olyā; also known as Chakā Zhāngeh, Chaqā Jangā-ye ‘Olyā, Chega Janga, Chega Jangeh, Chegha Changa Olya, Cheqā Jengā, Cheqā Jengāy, Cheqā Jengā-ye ‘Olyā, and Chīā Jengeh-ye ‘Olyā) is a village in Howmeh-ye Jonubi Rural District, in the Central District of Eslamabad-e Gharb County, Kermanshah Province, Iran. At the 2006 census, its population was 388, in 84 families.

References 

Populated places in Eslamabad-e Gharb County